Mexico–India relations, also called Mexican-Indian relations or Indo-Mexican relations, are the diplomatic relations between India and Mexico. Both nations are members of the G-20 major economies and the United Nations.

History
During colonialism in both India and Mexico, relations and trade were carried out by the Spanish who through the Manila-Acapulco Galleon traded with Indian traders and brought their products to New Spain (present day Mexico). In the 1500s, a few hundred Indians were taken as slaves and transported to Mexico. In the 1600s, an Indian woman in Mexico known as Catarina de San Juan was kidnapped by Portuguese pirates and brought to the Philippines. From there, she was brought to Mexico and sold to a man in the Mexican State of Puebla. Her presence in Puebla inspired the creation of the China poblana dress, based on the traditional gowns that she wore.

In 1947, Mexico became the first Latin American nation to recognize the independence of India from the United Kingdom. On first 1 August 1950, both nations established diplomatic relations and on the following year, Mexico opened an embassy in Delhi. To show the importance of the new relations between the two nations, the first Mexican ambassador to India was former Mexican President Emilio Portes Gil. In 1962, Nobel Prize laureate Octavio Paz was named ambassador to India.

In 1961, Prime Minister Jawaharlal Nehru became the first Indian head-of-state to pay a visit to Mexico. In 1962, Mexican President Adolfo López Mateos paid an official visit to India. There would be many more high-level visits between leaders of both nations. 

During the Goa liberation movement, when Indo-Portuguese tensions soared, Mexico offered the Indian government its influence in Latin America to bring pressure on the Portuguese to relieve tensions.

Both nations work closely in several multilateral organizations. The Sonora variety of Mexican wheat was fundamental in the Green Revolution in India. In 2010, India opened a cultural center in Mexico City in response to the broad interests manifested in Mexico by the different facets of Indian culture and lifestyle.

In June 2016, Indian Prime Minister Narendra Modi paid an official visit to Mexico. While in Mexico, Prime Minister Modi met with President Enrique Peña Nieto and the two leaders held bilateral, political and economic partnership discussions.

In March 2022, Mexican Foreign Minister Marcelo Ebrard paid a visit to India and met with his counterpart S. Jaishankar. While in India, Ebrard met with local business leaders in order to increase trade relations between India and Mexico. Ebrard also announced the upcoming opening of a Mexican consulate in Mumbai. The Consulate in Mumbai was opened in March 2023.

High-level visits

High-level visits from India to Mexico
 Prime Minister Jawaharlal Nehru (1961)
 Prime Minister Indira Gandhi (1981)
 President Zail Singh (1984)
 Prime Minister Rajiv Gandhi (1986)
 President Pratibha Patil (2008)
 Prime Minister Manmohan Singh (2012)
 Prime Minister Narendra Modi (2016)

High-level visits from Mexico to India
 President Adolfo López Mateos (1962)
 President Luis Echeverría (1975)
 President José López Portillo (1981)
 President Miguel de la Madrid (1985)
 President Felipe Calderón (2007)
 Foreign Minister Marcelo Ebrard (2022)

Bilateral agreements
Both nations have signed numerous bilateral agreements such as an Agreement on Cultural Cooperation (1975); Agreement on Scientific and Technical Cooperation (1975); Agreement on Economic and Financial Cooperation (1982); Agreement on Touristic Cooperation (1996); Memorandum of Understanding on Communication Cooperation (1996); Agreement on Cultural and Educational Exchanges (2005); Agreement on Visa Exemption for Official and Diplomatic Passports (2005); Extradition treaty (2006); Agreement on the Promotion and Reciprocal Protection of Investments (2007) and an Air service agreement (2008).

Migration
The Indian community in Mexico is relatively small and estimated to be around 5,500; comprising mostly software engineers of Indian IT companies. There are several executives in the Indian and international companies, academics/professors in the local universities and some private businessmen in textile and garment business. Most Indian academics and businessmen are permanent residents of Mexico, the rest are on short term work assignments of 2–3 years and get replaced after that.

Trade
In 2018, two-way trade between both nations amounted to US$10 billion. India's main exports to Mexico include: textiles, gems, jewelry, leather and software. Mexico's main exports to India include: petroleum, machinery, fertilizers and chemicals. Several Mexican multinational companies operate in India such as Cinépolis, Gruma, Grupo Bimbo, KidZania, and Nemak. Approximately 174 Indian companies invest and operate in Mexico.

Resident diplomatic missions
 India has an embassy in Mexico City.
 Mexico has an embassy in New Delhi and a consulate in Mumbai.

See also 
 Hinduism in Mexico
 Indian Mexicans
 Manabendra Nath Roy

References

 
Bilateral relations of Mexico
Mexico